Phyllis Maude Haver (January 6, 1899 – November 19, 1960) was an American actress of the silent film era.

Early life
Haver was born in Douglass, Kansas to  James Hiram Haver (1872–1936) and Minnie Shanks Malone (1879–1949). When she was young, her family moved to Los Angeles, California. Haver attended Los Angeles Polytechnic High. After graduating, she played piano to accompany the new silent films in local theaters.

Career

Haver auditioned for comedy producer Mack Sennett on a whim. Sennett hired her as one of his original Sennett Bathing Beauties. Within a few years, she appeared as a leading lady in two-reelers for Sennett Studios. In 1923, Buster Keaton cast her as the female lead in his short The Balloonatic.

Later, while signed with DeMille-Pathé, Haver played the part of murderess Roxie Hart in the first film adaptation of Chicago in 1927, opposite Hungarian film actor Victor Varconi. One reviewer called her performance "astoundingly fine," and added that Haver "makes this combination of tragedy and comedy a most entertaining piece of work."

She performed in the comedy film The Battle of the Sexes (1928), directed by D. W. Griffith, and appeared with Lon Chaney in his last silent film, Thunder (1929). Haver retired from the industry with two sound films to her credit.

Personal life
In 1929, she married millionaire William Seeman with a service performed by New York Mayor James J. Walker at the home of Rube Goldberg, the cartoonist. The couple divorced in 1945. Haver had no children.

Death
Haver retired in Sharon, Connecticut. She died at age 61 from an overdose of barbiturates in 1960.

Selected filmography

 Whose Baby? (1917)
 The Sultan's Wife (1917)
 The Pullman Bride (1917)
 '49–'17 (1917)
 Salome vs. Shenandoah (1919)
 Love, Honor and Behave (1920)
 A Small Town Idol (1921)
 The Bolted Door (1923)
 The Balloonatic (1923 short)
 The Common Law (1923)
 Lilies of the Field (1924)
 The Fighting Coward (1924)
 Single Wives (1924)
 The Breath of Scandal (1924)
 One Glorious Night (1924)
 The Foolish Virgin (1924) *lost film
 The Snob (1924) *lost film
 New Brooms (1925) *lost film
 After Business Hours (1925)
 I Want My Man (1925)
 Her Husband's Secret (1925) *lost film
 A Fight to the Finish (1925)
 The Caveman (1926) *partially lost, one reel is missing
 Up in Mabel's Room (1926)
 Don Juan (Uncredited, 1926)
 Other Women's Husbands (1926)
 Hard Boiled (1926)
 The Nervous Wreck (1926)
 3 Bad Men (1926)
 Fig Leaves (1926)
 What Price Glory (1926)
 The Way of All Flesh (1927) *lost film
 The Rejuvenation of Aunt Mary (1927) *lost film
 The Fighting Eagle (1927)
 No Control (1927)
 Your Wife and Mine (1927)
 The Wise Wife (1927)
 Chicago (1927)
 Nobody's Widow (1927)
 The Little Adventuress (1927)
 The Shady Lady (1928)
 The Battle of the Sexes (1928)
 Sal of Singapore (1928)
 Tenth Avenue (1928)
 Thunder (1929) *lost film, only half a reel survives
 The Office Scandal (1929)
 She Couldn't Say No (1930) *lost film, only soundtrack survives

References

Bibliography

External links

Phyllis Haver at Virtual History

1899 births
1960 deaths
Actresses from Kansas
American film actresses
American silent film actresses
Drug-related deaths in Connecticut
Barbiturates-related deaths
People from Douglass, Kansas
Actresses from Los Angeles
20th-century American actresses
1960 suicides